Hojjatabad-e Olya may refer to:
 Hojjatabad-e Olya, Kermanshah
 Hojjatabad-e Olya, Yazd